The 12 points were a list of demands written by the leaders of the Hungarian Revolution of 1848.

History
On the morning of March 15, 1848, revolutionaries marched around the city of Pest, reading Sándor Petőfi's Nemzeti dal (National Song) and the 12 points to the crowd (which swelled to thousands). Declaring an end to all forms of censorship, they visited the printing presses of Landerer and Heckenast and printed Petőfi's poem together with the demands. A mass demonstration was held in front of the newly built National Museum, after which the group left for the Buda Chancellery (the Office of the Governor-General) on the other bank of the Danube. When the crowd rallied in front of the Imperial Governing Council, the representatives of Emperor Ferdinand agreed to sign the 12 points.

Text 
What the Hungarian nation wants.

Let there be peace, liberty, and concord.

   We demand the freedom of the press, the abolition of censorship.
   Independent Hungarian government in Buda-Pest. (All ministries and the government must be elected by the parliament)
   Annual national assembly in Pest. (by democratic parliamentary elections, the abolition of the old feudal parliament which based on the feudal estates)
   Civil and religious equality before the law. (Universal equality before the law: The abolition of separate laws for the common people and nobility, the abolition of the legal privileges of nobility. Absolute religious liberty, the abolition of the (Catholic) State Religion)
   National army.
   Universal and equal taxation (abolition of the tax exemption of the aristocracy)
   The abolition of socage. (abolition of Feudalism and abolition of the serfdom of peasantry and their bondservices)
  Juries and courts based on an equal legal representation.(The common people can be elected as juries at the legal courts, all people can be officials even on the highest levels of the public administration and judicature, if they have the prescribed education)
   A national bank.
   The army must take an oath on the Constitution, send our soldiers home and take foreign soldiers away(repatriation of the Hungarian army).
   Setting free the political prisoners (amnesty for those who have opposed or criticized the government).
   Union [with Transylvania].

Equality, liberty, brotherhood!

References

Hungarian Revolution of 1848
1848 documents